Namchi-Singhithang is one of the 32 constituencies of Sikkim Legislative Assembly, in Sikkim, India. The current incumbent is ex-chief minister of Sikkim Pawan Kumar Chamling of the Sikkim Democratic Front who has been representing the constituency since the 2014 Sikkim Legislative Assembly election.

Members of Legislative Assembly
 2009: Pawan Kumar Chamling, Sikkim Democratic Front
 2009 (Bypolls): Binod Kumar Rai, Sikkim Democratic Front
 2014: Pawan Kumar Chamling, Sikkim Democratic Front

Election results

2019

See also

 Namchi
 South Sikkim district
 List of constituencies of Sikkim Legislative Assembly

References

Assembly constituencies of Sikkim
Namchi district